The Armadale Reptile Centre is a reptile zoo (featuring a number of other animals) in Armadale, Western Australia that focuses on herpetology and wildlife endemic to Australia (with a few exotic reptile species as exception).

Opened to the public in 1995, the Armadale Reptile Centre houses a large variety of mostly native reptiles and other wildlife with over 50 different reptile species on display, including a large female saltwater crocodile and various species of lizards, snakes and turtles, as well as other animals such as tree frogs, cockatoos, dingoes, emus, marsupials (including kangaroos), owls and wedge-tailed eagles. The centre is also used as a rescue and rehabilitation facility for wildlife that are sick or injured. Klaas and Mieke Gaikhorst built and own the centre, having worked with rescuing and rehabilitating injured or displaced reptiles (and other animals) for more than thirty years.

Species at the centre

Reptiles

Bardick
Black-headed python
Black-tailed monitor
Boa constrictor
Bobtail lizard
Boyd's forest dragon
Broad leaf-tailed gecko
Brown tree snake
Burton's legless lizard
Central bearded dragon
Centralian carpet python
Centralian blue-tongued lizard
Children's python
Common death adder
Common scaly-foot
Crowned snake
Dugite
Eastern snake-necked turtle
Eastern water dragon
Fraser's legless lizard
Frill-necked lizard
Gilbert's lashtail dragon
Gwardar
Jungle carpet python
King brown snake
King's skink
Lace monitor
Long-nosed lashtail dragon
Murray short-necked turtle
Northern giant cave gecko
Northern blue-tongued lizard
Oblong turtle
Olive python
Ornate crevice dragon
Perentie
Pygmy python
Pygmy spiny-tailed skink
Red-bellied black snake
Red-eared slider
Rosenberg's monitor
Rough knob-tailed gecko
Rough-scaled python
Saltwater crocodile
Sand goanna
Saw-shelled turtle
Southwest carpet python
Spiny-tailed ridge monitor
Spotted mulga snake
Spotted python
Stimson's python
Thick-tailed barking gecko
Water python
Western bearded dragon
Western tiger snake
Western blue-tongued lizard
Woma python

Amphibians
Australian green tree frog
Splendid tree frog
White-lipped tree frog

Others

(Birds)

African firefinch
Alexandrine parakeet
Australian barn owl
Australian boobook owl
Australian bustard
Australian magpie
Baudin's black-cockatoo
Black-faced woodswallow
Black-throated finch
Bourke's parrot
Bush stone-curlew
Cockatiel
Common bronzewing
Common pheasant
Diamond firetail
Domestic chicken
Double-barred finch
Dusky woodswallow
Eclectus parrot
Emu
Galah
Gouldian finch
Grey butcherbird
King quail
Laughing dove
Laughing kookaburra
Little corella
Long-billed corella
Long-tailed finch
Peewit lark
Major Mitchell's cockatoo
Nankeen kestrel
Orange-breasted waxbill
Painted finch
Peaceful dove
Pied butcherbird
Princess parrot
Red-backed kingfisher
Red-headed parrotfinch
Red-tailed black-cockatoo
Sacred kingfisher
Scarlet-chested parrot
Star finch
Stubble quail
Sulphur-crested cockatoo
Tawny frogmouth
Wedge-tailed eagle
Western corella

(Fish)
Frontosa cichlid
Perlmutt
Red fin borleyi

(Mammals)
Bare-nosed wombat
Dingo
Domestic donkey
Domestic pony
Grey-headed flying fox
Red kangaroo
Short-beaked echidna
Southwestern brushtail possum
Western grey kangaroo
Western wallaroo

External links

Armadale Reptile Centre - Western Australia, 6 minute YouTube video of 2013, by Western Australia Now and Then

Armadale, Western Australia
Zoos in Western Australia
1995 establishments in Australia
Buildings and structures in Perth, Western Australia
Tourist attractions in Perth, Western Australia
Wildlife parks in Australia